Muraltia flanaganii is a plant species in the milkwort family (Polygalaceae) that is endemic to rocky flats about  above sea level in the southwestern part of Cape Province, South Africa. The plant's clustered leaves are softly-haired and have sharp tips. It produces pink flowers which are also stalkless. It has been listed by the Red List of South African Plants as endangered since 2007 due to invasive species and habitat loss. It was first written about by Margaret Levyns in 1954 in the Journal of South African Botany. It was named "minuta", the Latin word for "small", in reference to the plant's small size.

References

Polygalaceae